PreussenElektra AG v Schleswag AG (2001) C-379/98 is a UK enterprise law case, electricity generation.

Facts
The German Electricity Feed-in Act 1998 §§2-3 (Stromeinspeisungsgesetz 1998) required regional electricity distribution companies to buy electricity from renewable energy sources in their area of supply at fixed minimum prices. Upstream energy suppliers were obliged to compensate distribution companies for additional costs. PreussenElektra AG (now part of E.ON), a privately owned upstream supplier, complained that the law was not compatible with the prohibition on state aid, then in TEC article 92(1) (now TFEU article 107(1)) even though it was a requirement of private entities to compensate one another. PreussenElektra and the Commission argued that (1) financial duties on regional distribution companies, like Schleswag, reduced the undertakings’ earnings, and reduced tax receipts for the states (2) the law converted private resources into public ones, with the same effect as a tax, and (3) because 6 of the 9 big upstream suppliers of energy were by majority state-owned, and 60% of shares in regional electricity suppliers were publicly owned, the payments should be considered state aid.

Judgment

Advocate General
AG Jacobs rejected that the feed-in tariff was state aid.

Court of Justice
Court of Justice rejected that the feed-in tariff was state aid.

See also

United Kingdom enterprise law
German Renewable Energy Sources Act

Notes

References

United Kingdom enterprise case law